The Sanyo MBC-550 is a small and inexpensive personal computer in "pizza-box" style, featuring an Intel 8088 microprocessor and running a version of MS-DOS. Sold by Sanyo, it was the least expensive early IBM PC compatible.

The MBC-550 has much better video display possibilities than the CGA card (8 colors at 640x200 resolution, vs CGA's 4 colors at 320x200 or 2 colors at 640x200), but it is not completely compatible with the IBM PC. The computer lacks a standard BIOS, having only a minimal bootloader in ROM that accesses hardware directly to load a RAM-based BIOS. The diskette format (FM rather than MFM) used is not completely compatible with the IBM PC, but special software on an original PC or PC/XT (but not PC/AT) can read and write the diskettes, and software expecting a standard 18.2 Hz clock interrupt has to be rewritten.

The MBC-550 was also the computer for NRI training. Starting by building the computer, the NRI promised you would be "qualified to service and repair virtually every major brand of computer". NRI advertised in Popular Mechanics and Popular Science throughout 1985.

The MBC-550 is less PC compatible than the IBM PCjr. Its inability to use much PC software was a significant disadvantage;  InfoWorld reported in August 1985 that Sanyo "has initiated a campaign to sell off" of MBC-550 inventory. The company's newer computers were, an executive claimed, 99% PC compatible.

Soft Sector Magazine 
SOFT SECTOR was a magazine for people who owned Sanyo MBC-550 and 555 DOS computers. (But much of the content equally applied to most IBM clones at the time.) A typical issue includes news, reviews, how-to's, technical advice and education, tips and tricks, as well as BASIC language programs that you could copy from the printed page, and adapt to suit your needs.

Models
MBC-550 : 1 x 5.25" disk drive (160 KB)
MBC-555 : 2 x 5.25" disk drive (160 KB)
MBC-555-2 : 2 x 5.25" disk drive (360 KB)
MBC-555-3 : 2 x 5.25" disk drive (720 KB)

References

Sanyo products
IBM PC compatibles